Beyond the Bright Sea is a 2017 children's historical adventure fiction written by the American author Lauren Wolk. It was published by Dutton Books for Young Readers on May 2, 2017

Plot
Beyond the Bright Sea is about a girl named Crow who was found on Elizabeth Islands by Osh. She is being raised by Osh and their neighbour Miss Magie. Years later, Crow grows up and tries to find out about her history and family.

Awards and reception
NPR Best Book of the Year 2017
Parents Magazine Best Book of the Year 2018
Booklist Editors’ Choice selection 
BookPage Best Book of the Year 2018
Horn Book Fanfare Selection 2018
Kirkus Best Book of the Year 2018
School Library Journal Best Book of the Year 2018
Charlotte Observer Best Book of the Year 2018
Southern Living Best Book of the Year 
New York Public Library Best Book of the Year 2018
Winner Scott O'Dell Award for Historical Fiction 2018

References

American children's novels
2017 American novels
American historical novels
Dutton Children's Books books